Zhang Jie (born 1965) is a Chinese retired para table tennis player. He won a Class 4 team bronze medal at the 2004 Summer Paralympics with Zhang Yan.

References

1965 births
Living people
Table tennis players at the 2004 Summer Paralympics
Paralympic medalists in table tennis
Medalists at the 2004 Summer Paralympics
Chinese male table tennis players
Paralympic bronze medalists for China
Paralympic table tennis players of China
Table tennis players from Qingdao
People from Pingdu